The Love Bugs is a 1917 American silent comedy film directed by and starring Oliver Hardy.

Cast
 Oliver Hardy as Babe (as Babe Hardy)
 Ethel Marie Burton as Ethel (as Ethel Burton)
 Joe Cohen as Cohen
 Florence McLaughlin

See also
 List of American films of 1917

External links

1917 films
1917 short films
American silent short films
American black-and-white films
1917 comedy films
Films directed by Oliver Hardy
Silent American comedy films
American comedy short films
1910s American films